Udo Lattek (16 January 1935 – 31 January 2015) was a German professional football player and coach.

Lattek is one of the most successful coaches in the history of the game, having won 15 major titles, most famously with Bayern Munich. He also won major trophies with Borussia Mönchengladbach and FC Barcelona. In addition to these clubs, his managerial career saw him coach Borussia Dortmund, Schalke 04 and 1. FC Köln before his retirement from the game. Alongside the Italian Giovanni Trapattoni and Portuguese José Mourinho, he is the only coach to have won all three major European club titles, and he is the only one to do so with three teams.

Early life
Lattek was born in Bosemb, East Prussia, Germany (now Boże, Poland). While Lattek was preparing for a career as a teacher, he played football with SSV Marienheide, Bayer 04 Leverkusen and VfR Wipperfürth. In 1962, he joined VfL Osnabrück. He spent his first season at the club in the first division (the northern division of the "Oberliga") and the remainder of his time in the second division, as the club did not qualify for the new Bundesliga at its inception 1963. He played primarily as a centre forward and became known for his heading ability. He scored 34 goals in 70 league matches between 1962 and 1965.

Early in 1965, Lattek was prematurely released from his playing contract to join the German football association DFB as a youth team coach alongside Dettmar Cramer, one of the assistants to head coach Helmut Schön. In this role he was also part of the coaching staff which led Germany into the final of the 1966 World Cup.

Career

Bayern Munich
In March 1970, Lattek took over the reins of Bayern Munich as successor of the Croatian, Branko Zebec. He was recommended to the club by Franz Beckenbauer, however his appointment was controversial as he had never previously coached a club side. To a team already boasting Beckenbauer, Gerd Müller and Sepp Maier, Lattek added the young talents of Paul Breitner and Uli Hoeneß, ushering in a period of near dominance for the Bavarian club. Lattek led Bayern to three consecutive league titles, a first in German football history, as well as the German Cup. In 1974 they became the first German team to win the European Champions Cup, defeating Atlético Madrid in the final, in a replay. It was the first of three consecutive European Cup successes for the club (although Lattek was only there for the first of them).

Six players from the Bayern side were also part of the West German side that won the 1974 World Cup and 1972 European Championship. A poor start to the 1974–75 domestic season saw Lattek's tenure come to an end, with Bayern replacing him with Dettmar Cramer, who was also recommended to the club by Beckenbauer. According to Lattek, after telling club president Wilhelm Neudecker that, given the club's poor domestic form changes were necessary, Neudecker replied, "Correct. You're sacked."

Borussia Mönchengladbach
At the beginning of the 1975–76 season, Lattek succeeded Hennes Weisweiler at Borussia Mönchengladbach, where he stayed until 1979. This spell saw him win two more German titles, in addition to achieving further European success with victory in the 1979 UEFA Cup final, defeating Red Star Belgrade. A third consecutive championship for him, which would have been a record fourth consecutive league championship for the club, eluded Mönchengladbach when they came second in the race to 1. FC Köln, managed by Lattek's predecessor Hennes Weisweiler, by the narrowest of margins, that of goal difference.

In 1977, the club reached the European Champions Cup final against Liverpool in Rome, which they lost 3–1. Liverpool declined to participate in the ensuing matches for the Intercontinental Cup, so Borussia took their place against South American champions Boca Juniors in the final. After drawing 2–2 in Argentina, Mönchengladbach lost the home match in Karlsruhe 3–0.

Borussia Dortmund
At the end of that season, Lattek quit Mönchengladbach and spent two undistinguished years with Borussia Dortmund. In his time at Mönchengladbach he had managed legendary striker Jupp Heynckes (226 goals in 375 league matches / 51 goals in 64 European competition matches), along with great Danish forward Allan Simonsen and such national team stalwarts as Berti Vogts, Rainer Bonhof, Uli Stielike, and Herbert Wimmer. At Dortmund he lacked that wealth of talent, and at the time his new club did not have the resources or the patience to develop it. His 15-year-old son also died from leukaemia at that time, leading him to seek a different working challenge as a distraction from the grief in his personal life.

FC Barcelona
In 1981, Lattek was appointed successor to Helenio Herrera at Spanish club FC Barcelona. He led the club to the European Cup Winners' Cup in 1982, defeating Standard Liège 2–1 in the final. He is the only coach to lead three clubs to three different major European trophies. On the field Barcelona was led by Migueli, Alexanco, Rexach, Asensi, Quini, the German Bernd Schuster, and the Dane, Allan Simonsen, Lattek's star signing from his old club, Mönchengladbach. In the second season Diego Maradona, then 22 years of age, was signed for a record transfer fee. However Barcelona did not win any domestic titles that year, and Lattek was replaced at the end of the 1982–83 season by the World Cup winning Argentine coach, César Luis Menotti, who it was hoped would bring out the best in Maradona.

Return to Bayern Munich
Lattek got his next managerial appointment from his former player Uli Hoeneß, who was by then in charge as commercial manager with his old side, Bayern Munich. Lattek succeeded the Hungarian coach Pal Csernai. In the next few years he won another league championship hat-trick with the club and two more national cups, the 'double" in 1986 being the fourth in German football history. However Bayern lost the 1987 European Champions Cup final 2–1 to FC Porto. Great players during his second stint with Bayern included Karl-Heinz Rummenigge, Lothar Matthäus, Klaus Augenthaler, Dieter Hoeneß, the Danish midfielder Søren Lerby and the Belgian national goalkeeper Jean-Marie Pfaff. As it had been with Borussia Mönchengladbach, his former player Jupp Heynckes followed him as coach here, too.

Cologne and Schalke
After the heady days at Bayern, Lattek retired for a few years. In 1991, he joined 1. FC Köln as Sporting Director and was head coach for one match as coach, where he achieved a home draw against Bayern. The rest of the season he spent with the club as technical manager. 1992 he returned once more to the dugout and led Schalke 04 through the first half of the season. His last match in Munich was a 1–1 draw against Bayern.

Return to Borussia Dortmund
Lattek officially retired and took up a role as TV commentator and newspaper columnist with the national broadsheet Die Welt and the bi-weekly sports magazine kicker. He was tempted out of retirement by his old team, Borussia Dortmund. The club had won the 1997 Champions League title, but was in panic mode towards the end of the 1999–2000 season, just one point above the relegation zone with five matches left to play. For what is speculated to be an extremely lucrative sum, as much as 250,000 Euros, the then 65-year-old Lattek took on the role of savior. His magic did the trick, two wins, two draws and only one defeat – against Bayern Munich – were enough to keep the club in the league. His last match was a 3–0 away triumph against Hertha BSC in front of a crowd of 75,000. At Dortmund he left a working base for his successor Matthias Sammer, who two years later at the age of 34 became the youngest coach to manage a German team to the league championship.

Coaching record

Later life
Lattek retired having won 14 major trophies. He still holds the record for having managed teams to the most Bundesliga titles, six with Bayern Munich and two with Borussia Mönchengladbach.

He lived in a nursing home in Cologne, where he was known for his continuous fondness of beer ("all great coaches have enjoyed a drink"). In 2012, Lattek suffered a stroke. Lattek later suffered from Parkinson's disease and dementia, and died on 31 January 2015. On the news of his death, Franz Beckenbauer tweeted: "Sad news: The great Udo Lattek is dead. Rest in peace, my friend."

Honours

Coach

Bayern Munich
Bundesliga: 1971–72, 1972–73, 1973–74, 1984–85, 1985–86, 1986–87
DFB-Pokal: 1970–71, 1983–84, 1985–86
European Cup: 1973–74

Borussia Mönchengladbach
Bundesliga: 1975–76, 1976–77
UEFA Cup: 1978–79

Barcelona
European Cup Winners' Cup: 1981–82

Individual 
ESPN 19th Greatest Manager of All Time: 2013
France Football 30th Greatest Manager of All Time: 2019
World Soccer 36th Greatest Manager of All Time: 2013

See also
 List of UEFA club competition winning managers
 List of European Cup and Champions League winning managers
 List of UEFA Cup Winners' Cup winning managers
 List of UEFA Cup winning managers

References

External links

 Udo Lattek on Myspace
 

1935 births
2015 deaths
People from Mrągowo
People from East Prussia
Sportspeople from Warmian-Masurian Voivodeship
German footballers
UEFA Cup winning managers
Bayer 04 Leverkusen players
VfL Osnabrück players
German football managers
Borussia Dortmund managers
FC Bayern Munich managers
West German expatriate football managers
FC Barcelona managers
La Liga managers
Borussia Mönchengladbach managers
FC Schalke 04 managers
Association football commentators
1. FC Köln managers
Bundesliga managers
UEFA Champions League winning managers
Neurological disease deaths in Germany
Deaths from Parkinson's disease
Expatriate football managers in Spain
Association football forwards
West German footballers
West German football managers
West German expatriate sportspeople in Spain
German refugees
Refugees in Denmark
World War II refugees
People from Wipperfürth
Sportspeople from Cologne (region)
Footballers from North Rhine-Westphalia
1. FC Köln non-playing staff